Barbara McCarthy may refer to 

 Barbara P. McCarthy, professor of Greek at Wellesley College
 Malarndirri McCarthy, an Australian politician